Silta is a rural locality (a selo) in Kudalinsky Selsoviet, Gunibsky District, Republic of Dagestan, Russia. The population was 257 as of 2010.

Geography 
Silta is located 18 km east of Gunib (the district's administrative centre) by road, on the Bardakuli River. Salta and Kudali are the nearest rural localities.

References 

Rural localities in Gunibsky District